Go South Coast is a bus operator on and around the south coast of England. It is a subsidiary of the Go-Ahead Group.

History

In August 2003 the Go-Ahead Group purchased the business of Wilts & Dorset, including its Damory Coaches and Tourist Group subsidiaries, followed in July 2005 by Southern Vectis including its Solent Blue Line subsidiary.

In February 2006 Wilts & Dorset purchased bus refurbishment company Hants & Dorset Trim. At this stage, Go-Ahead consolidated the management of its south coast operations under Go South Coast in Poole. In October 2006 Marchwood Motorways was purchased.

Thamesdown Transport was purchased from Swindon Borough Council in February 2017.

Subsidiaries
Go South Coast originally did not operate any buses in its own right, all being operated by subsidiary companies. Operators in italics are considered part of and managed by the bigger company above.
Bluestar – Hampshire
Unilink – University of Southampton

Hants & Dorset Trim
More – Bournemouth and Poole
UNIBUS – Bournemouth University and Arts University Bournemouth
Salisbury Reds – Salisbury
Southern Vectis – Isle of Wight
Swindon's Bus Company (formerly Thamesdown Transport) – Swindon

The company has three coach brands:
Excelsior Coaches – Bournemouth, offering private coach hire, school services and tours
Damory Coaches – school buses and services in central East Dorset
Tourist Group – Dorset and Wiltshire, providing services to schools in Wiltshire.

In June 2014, all the subsidiary companies' vehicles were brought together under the Go South Coast licence.

Fleet
As at May 2015, Go South Coast operated 760 buses and coaches from nine depots.

References

External links
 

Bus operators in Dorset
Bus operators in Hampshire
Bus operators on the Isle of Wight
Go-Ahead Group companies
 
2005 establishments in England